Lake St. Peter may refer to:

 Lac Saint-Pierre, part of the St. Lawrence River in Quebec, Canada
 Lake St. Peter (Ontario), a lake in Ontario, Canada
 Lake St. Peter, Ontario, or Hastings Highlands a hamlet in Ontario, Canada
 Lake St. Peter Provincial Park, Ontario